The Ping Huang Coffee Museum is a museum about coffee in Taibao City, Chiayi County, Taiwan.

Architecture
The museum spreads over two floors. The ground floor consists of the coffee knowledge area, Golden Mandeling avenue, tasting area and sales area. The upper floor consists of reserved guided area.

Activities
The museum features hands-on activities such as coffee making. It also provides information tours to visitors on the process of coffee making.

Transportation
The museum is accessible within walking distance southeast from Chiayi Station of the Taiwan High Speed Rail.

See also
 List of museums in Taiwan

References

External links
 

Museums with year of establishment missing
Drink museums in Taiwan
Museums in Chiayi County
Coffee museums